Baṅgamātā, Bangla Maa, Mother Bengal or simply বাংলা/ Bangla, is a personification of Bengal created during the Bengali Renaissance and later adopted by the Bengali nationalists. In Bangladeshi poetry, literature and patriotic song, she has become a symbol of Bangladesh, considered as a personification of the Republic. The Mother Bengal represents not only biological motherness but its attributed characteristics as well – protection, never ending love, consolation, care, the beginning and the end of life.

Bankim Chandra Chattopadhyay, a writer, poet and journalist from Bengal, composed an ode to Mother Bengal called Vande Mataram around 1876 as an alternative to the British royal anthem.

In Amar Sonar Bangla, the national anthem of Bangladesh, Rabindranath Tagore used the word "Maa" (Mother) numerous times to refer to the motherland, i.e. Bengal. Despite her popularity in patriotic songs and poems, her physical representations and images are rare.

History

Partition of Bengal
The first incarnations of Mother Bengal, or Bangamata, emerged during resistance to the partition of Bengal. The partition took place in October 1905 and separated the largely Muslim areas of Eastern Bengal from the largely Hindu areas of Western Bengal. Hindus living in Western Bengal, who dominated Bengal's businesses and rural life complained that the partition would make them a minority in a province due to the incorporation of the Bihar and Orissa Province into the Bengal Presidency. It was during this time the Mother Bengal was an immensely popular theme in Bengali patriotic songs and poems and was mentioned in several of them, such as the song ″Dhana Dhanya Pushpa Bhara″  and ″Banga Amar Janani Amar″ (Our Bengal Our Mother) by Dwijendralal Ray. These songs were meant to rekindle the unified spirit of Bengal, to raise public consciousness against the communal political divide.

Bangladesh Liberation War
Many of Bengali patriotic songs were regularly played on the Swadhin Bangla Betar Kendra, the clandestine radio station broadcast to revolutionaries and the Bengali public during the Bangladesh Liberation War. some of these patriotic songs, such as  “Jonmo Amar Dhonno Holo Maa-go” and “Bangla Moder Bangla Maa Amra Tomar Koti Shontan” have significant representations of “Mother Bengal”. She was an icon of freedom and democracy against all forms of dictatorship. These patriotic songs are still immensely popular in Bangladesh and West Bengal.

In art and literature
 Vande Mataram, by Bankim Chandra Chattopadhyay
 Banglar Mati Banglar Jol, by Rabindranath Tagore
 Banga Amar Janani Amar, by Dwijendralal Ray
 Bangamata (poem), by Rabindranath Tagore
 Amar Sonar Bangla, by Rabindranath Tagore in 1905
O Amar Desher Mati, by Rabindranath Tagore
 Bangladesh, by Kazi Nazrul Islam
 Aaji Bangladesher Hridoy, by Rabindranath Tagore
 Bangla Mayer Kol, by Meera Dev Burman and S. D. Burman; better known by first line Takdum Takdum Bajai Bnagladesher Dhol
 Oh Amar Bangla Maa, by Abul Umrah Fakhruddin and Alauddin Ali 

In his patriotic song, known as Aaji Bangladesher Hridoy (1905), the poet Rabindranath Tagore wrote the following depiction of Bangladesh:
When did you come out of the heart of Bangladesh,
O, Mother dear, with such inexplicable splendor!
It’s impossible to take away eyes from you!
The doors of your golden temple have unlocked.
Your right hand holds the blazing sword, the left one takes away fear,
Smile of affection on the eyes, the third eye glaring.
O Mother dear, how uniquely you reveal yourself!
The cloud of your untied hair conceals thunders
Ends of your sunlight coloured robes flutter in the horizon!
It’s impossible to take away eyes from you!
The doors of your golden temple have unlocked.
When impassionately did not look up seemed
Poor mother stayed back home , desolate, destitute.
Your torn clothes vanish now, meager smile disappear.
Beams of light scatter from your feet into entire sky
O Mother, your appearance astounds me.
You flood the world with the flow of happiness on the distressed nights
O the mindblower, your word of fearlessness drum the heart
It’s impossible to take away eyes from you!
The doors of your golden temple have unlocked.

This is most probably only picturesque details of Mother Bengal.

See also
 National personification, contains the list of personifications for various nations and territories.
 Bharat Mata, the national personification of India as a mother goddess.
 Sri Lanka Matha, the national personification in the national anthem of Sri Lanka as a mother goddess. 
 Siam Devadhiraj, the national personification of Thailand as a deity.
 Vande Mataram, song sung in reverence of Bharat Mata and Banga Mata. 
 Joy Bangla
 Columbia, an equivalent symbol for the United States.

References

National personifications
National symbols of Bangladesh
Bengal